Vanderbilt is a borough in Fayette County, Pennsylvania, United States. The population was 414 at the 2020 census, a decline from the figure of 476 tabulated in 2010. The town is named for the railroad tycoon Cornelius Vanderbilt and is served by the Connellsville Area School District.

Geography
Vanderbilt is located in northern Fayette County at  (40.034078, -79.663825).

Demographics

As of the census of 2000, there were 553 people, 222 households, and 150 families residing in the borough. The population density was 2,995.9 people per square mile (1,186.2/km2). There were 234 housing units at an average density of 1,267.7 per square mile (501.9/km2). The racial makeup of the borough was 96.56% White and 3.44% African American.

There were 222 households, out of which 29.3% had children under the age of 18 living with them, 52.3% were married couples living together, 13.1% had a female householder with no husband present, and 32.4% were non-families. 27.5% of all households were made up of individuals, and 12.6% had someone living alone who was 65 years of age or older. The average household size was 2.49 and the average family size was 3.07.

In the borough the population was spread out, with 23.5% under the age of 18, 9.4% from 18 to 24, 26.8% from 25 to 44, 26.0% from 45 to 64, and 14.3% who were 65 years of age or older. The median age was 38 years. For every 100 females there were 90.7 males. For every 100 females age 18 and over, there were 88.0 males.

The median income for a household in the borough was $28,125, and the median income for a family was $39,306. Males had a median income of $32,083 versus $17,500 for females. The per capita income for the borough was $14,045. About 9.4% of families and 18.7% of the population were below the poverty line, including 19.8% of those under age 18 and 8.9% of those age 65 or over.

Mine fire
Vanderbilt is the site of a mine fire, which, unlike the one in Centralia, Pennsylvania, has had comparably little impact on the borough.

References

Populated places established in 1903
Pittsburgh metropolitan area
Boroughs in Fayette County, Pennsylvania
1903 establishments in Pennsylvania